Sir Thomas Littleton, 3rd Baronet, often Thomas de Littleton, (3 April 1647 – 31 December 1709), of North Ockendon, Essex and Stoke St. Milborough, Shropshire, was an English lawyer and Whig politician who sat in the English and British House of Commons between 1689 and 1709. He served as Speaker of the House of Commons of England from 1698 to 1700, and as Treasurer of the Navy until his death.
 
Littleton was the son of Sir Thomas Littleton, 2nd Baronet (died 1681), and his wife and cousin Anne Littleton. He was related to Thomas de Littleton, a 15th-century jurist and legal theorist of the Littleton/Lyttelton family. He matriculated at St Edmund Hall, Oxford in 1665 and was admitted at Inner Temple in 1666. In 1671, he was called to the bar. He succeeded his father in the baronetcy on 12 April 1681.  On 6 September 1682, he married Anne Baun (died 1714), daughter of Benjamin Baun alias Baron, of Westcote, Gloucestershire.

Littleton was returned as Member of Parliament for Woodstock at the 1689 English general election. He was Speaker of the House of Commons of England from 1698 to 1700. He was appointed Treasurer of the Navy in 1699 and held the post for the rest of his life. At the 1702 English general election he was returned as MP for Castle Rising. At the 1705 English general election he was returned as MP for Chichester. He was returned as MP for Portsmouth at the 1708 British general election.

Upon his death, without issue in 1709 aged 62, the baronetcy expired, but his estate passed to his first cousin Mrs Elizabeth Meynell, the daughter of his uncle Edward Littleton.
 
Macaulay thus sums up the character of Speaker Littleton and his relations with the Whigs: "He was one of their ablest, most zealous and most steadfast friends; and had been, both in the House of Commons and at the board of treasury, an invaluable second to Montague" (the Earl of Halifax).

References 

Littleton, Thomas, 3rd Bt
Speakers of the House of Commons of England
Members of the Parliament of Great Britain for English constituencies
1647 births
1709 deaths
People from North Ockendon
English MPs 1689–1690
English MPs 1690–1695
English MPs 1695–1698
English MPs 1698–1700
English MPs 1701
English MPs 1701–1702
English MPs 1702–1705
English MPs 1705–1707
British MPs 1707–1708
British MPs 1708–1710
Thomas